Pennsylvania Hall may be:

Pennsylvania Hall (Philadelphia)
Pennsylvania Hall (Gettysburg, Pennsylvania)
Pennsylvania Hall (Pittsburgh)

Architectural disambiguation pages